John Herman Cox ( Kaplan; born July 15, 1955) is an American businessman, housing developer, and political activist, who has run for public office several times, mostly recently for Governor of California as the GOP candidate.

Cox began his political career as a Democrat, as he ran to be a delegate to the 1976 National Convention. He later became a Republican  in Illinois, running for a congressional seat in 2000, United States Senate in 2002, Cook County Recorder of Deeds in 2004, and President of the United States in 2008.

After moving to California, he proposed the California is not for Sale initiative to combat corruption. Cox became the Republican nominee in the 2018 California gubernatorial election, after placing second in the state's June 5 nonpartisan blanket primary. On November 6, 2018, he lost to Democrat Gavin Newsom in the state’s biggest gubernatorial landslide since 1950. Cox was a candidate in the unsuccessful 2021 California gubernatorial recall election, placing 5th with a total of 4.4% of the vote.

Early life
Born John Kaplan, Cox is the son of Priscilla (Pick) and Albert Kaplan. He has an older half brother, Michael, from his mother's first marriage. Following her divorce from his biological father, his mother married Thomas Cox, a post office supervisor, who adopted him and moved the family to the Chicago suburb of Alsip, Illinois. Cox graduated from Harold L. Richards High School in Oak Lawn, Illinois. He put himself through college by teaching tennis and earned his B.A. degree from the University of Illinois at Chicago, where he majored in accounting and political science. He received his J.D. degree from the Illinois Institute of Technology's Chicago-Kent College of Law at night while working days at Coopers & Lybrand as an accountant. He and his first wife, Nancy, divorced. He married his second wife, Sarah. Cox was raised by a Jewish mother. He now practices Catholicism with his family.

Business career 

In 1981, he founded a law firm specializing in corporate law and tax planning, John H. Cox and Associates. In 1985, he founded Cox Financial Group Ltd., which specializes in investment counseling, income tax planning, retirement planning, and asset protection. Although Cox takes credit for the financial turnaround of the Japp family Chicago potato-chip firm, its owners sued Cox in 1998, alleging financial misconduct, a case that was settled on August 24, 1999 when Cox purchased from the  plaintiffs real estate interests he considered worth $3 million for $1.7 million -- from his viewpoint, a favorable settlement).

Political career

Early political involvement 
Cox hosted The Progressive Conservative, a twice-weekly bought-time radio talk show on low-wattage WJJG 1530 AM in Chicago. Featuring guests like Michael Moriarty, its themes included criticism of trial lawyers and creation of a website in March 2003 that nominated public figures (such as Janeane Garofalo, Martin Sheen, and Jacques Chirac) as "Friends of Saddam".

Cox became a Republican later on, serving on Jack Kemp's steering committee in 1987. He later served as President of the Cook County Republican Party.  At the 2006 Conservative Political Action Conference (CPAC), Cox debated the issue of capital punishment as an opponent of the death penalty.

Illinois political campaigns 
Cox ran for a position as a delegate to the 1976 Democratic National Convention. In 2000, Cox ran for Congress in Illinois's 10th congressional district to replace retiring Congressman John Edward Porter, finishing fifth in the Republican primary race, with 6,339 votes, 10.09%, to former Porter aide Mark Kirk, despite spending half a million dollars on his campaign. In 2002, Cox ran for U.S. Senate in Illinois on a conservative platform, aligning himself with Reagan Republicans. He lost the Republican primary with 23%, placing third behind Jim Durkin and Jim Oberweis.

In 2004, Cox garnered 29.26% of the votes against incumbent Democrat Eugene Moore in the Cook County Recorder of Deeds race. Cox said he decided to run for the office to eliminate the position; he saw the office as an unnecessary duplication of services that had become a "model of waste and corruption".

2008 presidential campaign 
On March 9, 2006, Cox announced his candidacy for the Republican nomination for President of the United States in 2008, becoming the first Republican to formally enter the 2008 presidential race. He dropped out of the race later in the year, but did appear on several primary ballots. Cox became a part-time resident of California in 2007, and in 2011 he became a full-time resident of Rancho Santa Fe.

Proposed initiatives 

Cox authored different versions of the Neighborhood Legislature constitutional amendment initiative but failed to qualify it due to lack of signatures for each of the four consecutive general ballots from 2012 to 2018. The final version was called 'The Low-Cost, New Hampshire-Style Neighborhood Legislature Act.' It was inspired by the part-time, 'non-careerist' 400-member New Hampshire Assembly. It would have shrunk each legislator's budget by a third, and imposed a cap on their salaries.

In 2016, Cox proposed an initiative statute that would require legislators to wear the logos of their top 10 donors on their suits when advocating for policies on the Senate or Assembly floor, much like NASCAR drivers wear sponsors on their race suits. Due to insufficient signatures, it failed to qualify for the general election that year. While the initiative was probably not legal due to a 1940s federal legal finding that politicians could not be forced to reveal or display their donors publicly, the intention was to get the voters to be concerned about who the legislators were beholden to, and, thereby, just like the Neighborhood Legislature measure, reduce the power of special interest money.

2018 California gubernatorial election 

On March 7, 2017, Cox announced his candidacy for Governor of California in the 2018 election. He garnered the support of 55% of Republican delegates at the spring 2018 California Republican Convention, but fell short of the 60% needed for the party's endorsement. Cox obtained the endorsements of Newt Gingrich and Donald Trump. Cox also received endorsements from eight Republican members of Congress, including House Minority Leader Kevin McCarthy, Devin Nunes, Jeff Denham, and Mimi Walters, as well as by the National Right to Life Committee.

Cox launched his campaign with the slogan "clean out the barn". Cox promised to bring California low taxes, less business regulation, better infrastructure, and repeal of the gas tax. Cox reportedly contributed $4.4 million to his own campaign.

On June 5, 2018, Cox finished second in the top-two nonpartisan blanket primary for Governor of California. In the general election that November, he lost to Democratic nominee and incumbent Lieutenant Governor Gavin Newsom, who won by roughly 24 points.

2021 California recall election 

With speculation rising of a potential recall election to recall Newsom, Cox donated $50,000 to the California Patriot Coalition in support of the recall of his former opponent. 

On April 26, 2021, the recall effort was announced to have enough signatures to qualify for a ballot effort. On May 4, 2021, Cox began his campaign in the recall election to replace Newsom as governor, branding himself as "the beast", running against "beauty".

While running again for governor in 2021, Cox was served with a subpoena during a live debate on August 17. The subpoena by a San Diego County court was for an alleged failure to pay a debt of about $100,000 from the 2018 gubernatorial campaign. Cox deemed the case frivolous, and it went away as Cox was not legally liable for any debts to the plaintiff.

2022 California gubernatorial election 

In September 2020, Cox launched an exploratory committee for a 2022 gubernatorial run. On February 8, 2021, Cox announced his second run for governor.

Political positions 
Cox began his political career as a moderate Democrat, but has become known for his positions as a conservative Republican. Cox holds a consistent life ethic, being strongly opposed to both abortion and the death penalty. He has taken other socially conservative positions, including opposing gay rights and the separation between church and state, while supporting the construction of a border wall. On economic issues, he opposes the gas tax and California's high speed rail proposal.

Abortion 
Although his perspective has evolved, citing the fact that he is a Catholic, Cox has said that he is pro-life. 

During the Values Voter presidential debate in 2006, Cox said that he would nominate only judges who are committed to reversing prior court decision where allegedly activist judges "strayed from the judicial role and legislated from the bench."

Border wall 
In January 2018, Cox stated he was opposed to the construction of a border wall. Rival GOP gubernatorial candidate Travis Allen has commented that Cox has "flip-flopped" on his position. Cox has since stated that he supports a southern border wall.

Death penalty 
Cox has stated that he opposes the death penalty on grounds of his religious commitment to the Roman Catholic Church as well as the financial burden associated with the procedure.

Donald Trump 
Cox did not support Donald Trump during the 2016 United States presidential election, voting for Libertarian Gary Johnson instead. Cox's support for the Libertarian ticket in 2016 and his ambivalence toward President Trump drew criticism from some Republicans as aligning with the Never Trumper movement. By January 2018, Cox characterized his vote for Johnson as "a mistake", but did not indicate who he would have voted for instead. Cox attempted to distance himself from Donald Trump during his gubernatorial campaign; when asked about Trump, he stated to Politico "...no comment. Was that fast enough for you?" 

President Trump endorsed John Cox on May 19, 2018, via Twitter stating "California finally deserves a great Governor, one who understands borders, crime and lowering taxes". Advertising from Gavin Newsom's campaign portrayed Cox as Trump's protégé. On May 28, 2018, Trump tweeted a further endorsement of Cox as "...a really good and highly competent man". The president's daughter-in-law, Lara Trump, endorsed Cox in the gubernatorial election as well.

Gas tax repeal 
In 2018, Cox submitted approximately 811,000 signatures in an effort to repeal the 2017 fuel tax increase.

The tax was approved as SB 1 in April 2017 by the Democratic-controlled Legislature and signed into law by Governor Jerry Brown. The tax took effect November 1, 2017, increasing gasoline by 12 cents a gallon and diesel by 20 cents.

LGBTQ rights 
In February 2018, Cox drew criticism for comments he made in 2007 linking gay rights with transvestism, polygamy, and bestiality. He has said that his views have changed and that he is "looking forward to engaging the LGBTQ community and all Californians to revive the California Dream."

High-speed rail 
Cox is against the construction of the California High-Speed Rail project.

Marijuana 
Cox has stated that "I'd like to go to the Portugal system where they actually put people who use marijuana in hospitals and cure them of their substance abuse." He supports medical cannabis.

Separation of church and state 
During a campaign event in 2008, Cox proclaimed: "There is no separation of church and state in the Constitution."

Electoral history

US Senate

Cook County Recorder of Deeds

California Governor

References

External links
 Official campaign website (archived page)
 Local candidate for governor hopes to carry GOP flag
 Project Vote Smart – John H. Cox voter information
 
 
 
 
 
 
 David Gargill, "Not what it takes: Running for president on less than $2,000 a day", Harper's Magazine, February 2008 (subscription required for online access)

1955 births
21st-century American politicians
American people of Jewish descent
American accountants
American political commentators
American talk radio hosts
American anti–death penalty activists
Businesspeople from Chicago
California Republicans
Candidates in the 2018 United States elections
Candidates in the 2021 United States elections
Catholics from California
Catholics from Illinois
Chicago-Kent College of Law alumni
Illinois lawyers
Illinois Republicans
Living people
People from Rancho Santa Fe, California
Politicians from Chicago
Radio personalities from Chicago
Candidates in the 2008 United States presidential election
University of Illinois Chicago alumni